Vaadhoo (Dhivehi: ވާދޫ) is one of the inhabited islands of Raa Atoll, Maldives. Famous for the bioluminescence plankton (Redhan), the spectacular "Sea of Stars" can be experienced in this island yearly. With clean roads and white sandy beaches Vaadhoo is one of the most beautiful inhabited island in Maldives and its local tourism industry is expected to boom in the upcoming years.

Geography

Ecology

Vaadhoo island is famous for the 'sea of stars.' This marine bioluminescence is generated by phytoplankton known as dinoflagellates. Woodland Hastings of Harvard University has for the first time identified a special channel in the dinoflagellate cell membrane that responds to electrical signals—offering a potential mechanism for how the algae create their unique illumination.

Demography

Total population of the island was more than 500 in 2007.

References

Islands of the Maldives